is a shōjo manga by Rei Toma which was serialized in Shogakukan's Cheese! and is licensed in North America by Viz Media.

Plot 
Asahi, a modern-day girl, is whisked away to a strange land. She then befriends a boy named Subaru, who helps Asahi grow accustomed to this other land. But despite Subaru's efforts, Asahi gets in trouble when she's offered as a sacrifice to a water dragon god! Surprisingly, the god takes a liking to Asahi and decided to make her his bride once she grows older.

Characters 
 
Asahi is described to be beautiful, with curly red hair and strangely-colored eyes. Asahi becomes the water-priestess, when she is supposedly under the "protection" of the water dragon god. She also wins the affection of a boy named Subaru. 

 Subaru is Asahi's aid and is in love with Asahi after Book 1.

Kogahiko

Subaru's Mother

Shiina is sister of Subaru.

Media

Manga
Toma began the manga in Shogakukan's shōjo manga magazine, Cheese! on February 24, 2015. Viz Media announced during their Anime Expo 2016 panel that they have licensed the manga.

Volumes

See also
Dawn of the Arcana, another manga series by the same author
The King's Beast, another manga series by the same author

Notes

References

External links
 

Fantasy anime and manga
Romance anime and manga
Shogakukan manga
Shōjo manga
Viz Media manga